Samoana ganymedes, common name the "Polynesian tree snail", is a species of tropical, air-breathing land snail, a terrestrial, pulmonate, gastropod mollusc in the family Partulidae. This species is endemic to Tahuata and Hiva Oa, Marquesas Islands, French Polynesia.

References

G
Fauna of French Polynesia
Molluscs of Oceania